A creole language is a stable natural language developed from a mixture of different languages. Unlike a pidgin, a simplified form that develops as a means of communication between two or more groups, a creole language is a complete language, used in a community and acquired by children as their native language.

This list of creole languages links to Wikipedia articles about languages that linguistic sources identify as creoles. The "subgroups" list links to Wikipedia articles about language groups defined by the languages from which their vocabulary is drawn.

Assamese-based creole languages 
 Nagamese creole, ("Naga Pidgin") is an Assamese-lexified creole language which, depending on location, has also been described and classified as an "extended pidgin" or "pidgincreole", Spoken natively by an estimated 30,000 people in the Indian northeastern state of Nagaland, India.

Bengali-based creole languages 
 Andaman Creole Hindi, a creole of Bengali, Hindustani and Tamil
 Bishnupriya Manipuri, a creole of Bengali language and Meitei language (officially known as Manipuri language)

English-based creole languages 
 Angloromani, English-based, spoken in the United Kingdom
 Australian Kriol, English-based, spoken in parts of Western Australia, Northern Territory, and Northern Queensland
 Bahamian Creole, English Creole spoken in The Bahamas
 Bajan Creole or Barbadian Creole, English-based, spoken in Barbados
 Belizean Creole, English-based creole spoken in Belize
 Bislama, an English-based creole, spoken in Vanuatu
 Cameroonian Creole, English, French and Native Cameroonian language based
 Fijian Creole, English-based creole spoken in Fiji
 Gullah language, spoken in the coastal region of the US states of North and South Carolina, Georgia and northeast Florida
 Guyanese Creole, English-based, spoken in Guyana
 Hawaiian Creole or Pidgin, a mixture of Native Hawaiian and American English similar to Tok Pisin
 Hongkongese Creole, a Cantonese-based creole featured with English vocabularies and loanwords with an altered accent influenced by English
 Huancaíno Patois, English-based creole spoken in Huancayo, Peru
 Krio language, English-based creole spoken throughout the West African nation of Sierra Leone
 Jamaican Patois, English-based creole, spoken in Jamaica
 Liberian Kreyol language, spoken in Liberia
 Nigerian Creole, English based creole or pidgin spoken in Nigeria 
 Ndyuka, English-based creole spoken in Suriname, the only creole that uses its own alphabet, called the Afaka script
 Pitkern, English spoken on the Pitcairn Islands and Norfolk Islands
 Manglish, English-based, spoken in Malaysia
 San Andrés–Providencia Creole, English-based creole spoken in (San Andrés and Providencia islands), Colombia
 Singlish, English-based, spoken in Singapore
 Tok Pisin, an official language of Papua New Guinea
 Tongan Creole, English-based creole spoken in Tonga
 Torres Strait Creole or Brokan, spoken in far north-east Australia, Torres Strait, and south-west Papua
 Trinidadian Creole, English-based, spoken in Trinidad
 Sranan Tongo, English-based creole language and (lingua franca) spoken in Suriname
 The Middle English creole hypothesis argues that English itself is a creole.
 Saint Kitts Creole, English Creole or dialect spoken on the island of St. Kitts

Dutch-based creole languages 
Americas:

 Berbice Creole Dutch, formerly spoken in the Berbice region of Guyana; extinct as of 2005 with the death of Bertha Bell.
 Jersey Dutch, formerly spoken by the New York Dutch of New Jersey, as well as Black people with New York Dutch heritage.
 Mohawk Dutch, formerly spoken in the area around Albany, New York, by Dutch settlers, the Mohawk nation, and people of Dutch and Mohawk descent.
 Negerhollands, formerly spoken in the Danish West Indies, now the U.S. Virgin Islands; extinct as of 1987 with the death of Alice Stevens.
 Skepi Creole Dutch, formerly spoken in the Essequibo region of Guyana, extinct as of 1998.

Southeast Asia:

 Javindo, formerly spoken by Indo families and their children, likely extinct as of 2007
 Petjo, spoken by Indos in Indonesia and the Netherlands, likely very few speakers left.

French-based creole languages 
 Antillean Creole, French-based creole spoken in the French West Indies
 Dominican Creole French
 Grenadian Creole French
 Saint Lucian Creole
Bourbonnais Creoles, French-based creoles spoken in the Mascarene Islands, with influence from English, Portuguese, Hindi, Tamil and Malagasy
Agalega Creole
Chagossian Creole
Mauritian Creole
Reunion Creole
Rodriguan Creole
Seychellois Creole
 Cameroonian French Creole, French-based creole spoken in Cameroon
 Chiac, French, English, Eastern Algonquian based, spoken in communities in The Maritimes of Canada
 Guianan Creole, French-based creole spoken in French Guiana
 Haitian Creole, French-based, an official language of Haiti
 Louisiana Creole, French-based, spoken in Louisiana
 Michif, French and Cree based, spoken by groups of the Métis People in Canada.
 Karipúna French Creole, spoken by the Karipuna people of Amapa, Brazil.

Portuguese-based creole languages 
 Americas:
 Papiamento, spoken in the ABC islands in the southern Caribbean
 Saramaccan, creole language of Suriname with vocabulary built based on English, Portuguese, and West and Central African languages
 Upper Guinea and Cape Verde:
 Cape Verdean Creole, spoken on the islands of Cape Verde
 Guinea-Bissau Creole, spoken in Guinea-Bissau
 São Vicente Creole, spoken in São Vicente on the islands of Cape Verde
 Gulf of Guinea:
 Angolar Creole, spoken in the southernmost towns of São Tomé Island and sparsely along the coast.
 Annobonese Creole, Portuguese-based creole spoken in Annobón, Equatorial Guinea
 Forro Creole, spoken in São Tomé and Príncipe
 Principense Creole, almost extinct, spoken in towns on Principe Island
 Indo-Portuguese creoles:
 Bengali Portuguese Creole, formerly spoken in Hooghly, Dhaka, Chandernagore, Chittagong, and other cities in the Bengal region
 Bombay Portuguese Creole, formerly spoken in Mumbai, Thane, and islands of Mumbai including Salsette and Mazagaon.
 Cannanore Portuguese Creole, spoken in Kannur, Kerala, estimated less than 20 speakers remaining
 Ceylon Portuguese Creole, spoken by Portuguese Burghers and Sri Lankan Kaffirs in Sri Lanka
 Cochin Portuguese Creole, formerly spoken in Vypin Island and Fort Cochin in Kochi, Kerala; extinct as of 2010 with the death of William Rozario.
 Daman and Diu Portuguese creole, also known as Daman and Diu Indo-Portuguese, refers to varieties of Portuguese-based creole spoken in Daman and Diu.
 Goa Portuguese Creole, spoken by Goan Catholics in Goa.
 Korlai Portuguese Creole, spoken in by Luso-Indian Catholics in villages around Korlai Fort, Maharashtra.
 Norteiro Creole, formerly spoken by colonial ancestors of Luso-Indian Catholics in Vasai, Mumbai.
Southeast Asia:
Kristang language, spoken in Malaysia and Singapore with diasporas in Perth, Western Australia
Macanese Patois, or Macau creole, Pátua, spoken in Macau in China
Thai Portuguese Creole, formerly spoken in the Bangkok neighborhood of Kudi Chin by Thai Catholics of Portuguese descent
Bayingyi, formerly spoken by the Bayingyi people of Myanmar of mixed Burmese and Portuguese descent.
Mardijker, formerly spoken by Mardijkers, a creole people native to Jakarta of Indonesian, Betawi, Dutch, Portuguese, Indian, and African descent; extinct as of 2010 with the death of Oma Mimi Abrahams.
Portuguis, formerly spoken on Ambon and Ternate in the Maluku Islands by Christians of mixed Portuguese and Moluccan ancestry
Bidau Creole Portuguese, formerly spoken by Timorese mesticos in the Bidau neighborhood of Dili, East Timor.

Creole languages based on other languages 
 Andaman Creole Hindi, a Hindustani-based creole language spoken in the Andaman Islands
 Betawi, a Malay-based Creole language spoken in Indonesia
 Chavacano, a Spanish-based creole language spoken in the Philippines
 Hezhou, based on Uyghur and relexified by Mandarin
 Juba Arabic, based on Arabic spoken in and around Juba, South Sudan
 Nagamese Creole, based on Assamese, used in Nagaland, India
 Negerhollands, a Dutch-based creole, once spoken in the U.S. Virgin Islands
 Palenquero, a Spanish-based creole spoken in the town of San Basilio de Palenque
 Sango language, Ngbandi-based creole language spoken in the Central African Republic
 Unserdeutsch language, a German-based creole language spoken primarily in Australia and in parts in Papua New Guinea
 Yilan Creole Japanese, spoken by Atayal indigenous people in Hanhsi village, Yilan County, Taiwan

Subgroups 
 Arabic-based creole languages, a creole language which was significantly influenced by the Arabic language
 Dutch-based creole languages, a creole language that has been substantially influenced by the Dutch language
 English-based creole languages, a creole language derived from the English language
 French-based creole languages, a creole language based on the French language
 German-based creole languages, a creole language based on the German language
 Malay-based creole languages, regional varieties derived from a lingua franca called Bazaar Malay
 Portuguese-based creole languages, creole languages which have Portuguese as superstrate language
 Spanish-based creole languages, a number of creole languages are based on the Spanish language

See also
 Pidgin
 Middle English creole hypothesis
 List of macaronic languages

Pidgins and creoles
Creole